Chaminda Hathurusingha (born 9 October 1971) is a Sri Lankan cricketer. He played 94 first-class and 31 List A matches between 1992 and 2008. He his now an umpire and stood in matches in the 2016–17 Premier League Tournament.

References

External links
 

1971 births
Living people
Sri Lankan cricketers
Sri Lankan cricket umpires
Burgher Recreation Club cricketers
Kurunegala Youth Cricket Club cricketers
Lankan Cricket Club cricketers
Moors Sports Club cricketers
Moratuwa Sports Club cricketers
Sri Lanka Police Sports Club cricketers
Tamil Union Cricket and Athletic Club cricketers
Cricketers from Colombo